The 1947 San Jose State Spartans football team represented San Jose State College during the 1947 college football season.

San Jose State competed in the California Collegiate Athletic Association. The team was led by head coach Wilbur V. Hubbard, in his second year, and played home games at Spartan Stadium in San Jose, California. They finished the season with a record of nine wins and three losses (9–3, 3–2 CCAA).

Schedule

Team players in the NFL
No San Jose State players were selected in the 1948 NFL Draft.

The following finished their San Jose State career in 1947, were not drafted, but played in the NFL.

Notes

References

San Jose State
San Jose State Spartans football seasons
San Jose State Spartans football